Kamiak Butte County Park is located in Whitman County, Washington between the towns of Palouse and Pullman in Eastern Washington, near the border of Idaho. It is named after Chief Kamiakin of the Yakama tribe.  Most of the park's  consist of timberland on the northern slopes of Kamiak Butte. The park includes Pine Ridge Trail, a National Recreation Trail within the National Trails System.
Kamiak Butte and nearby Steptoe Butte comprise Steptoe and Kamiak Buttes National Natural Landmark. This  area, designated in 1965, includes land in state and county ownership.

The reddish rocks once formed the bed of an ancient sea, and the grains of sand embedded in them can still be seen glittering in the sun. Later in its geological history, Kamiak Butte became part of a mountain range which was eventually nearly engulfed by the Cenozoic lava flows that covered most of Eastern Washington in a layer of basalt. Steptoe and Kamiak Buttes are outliers of Idaho's Coeur d'Alene Mountains.

The region's intensive wheat and lentil farming has made Kamiak Butte an important haven for indigenous plant and animal species. Over 170 plant species, 140 bird species, and 30 mammal species have been observed inside the park.

For most visitors, the park's chief attraction is the Pine Ridge Trail, a  loop which begins at a parking area and climbs through evergreen forestland to an exposed ridge. The trail continues along the ridge, affording views of the surrounding Palouse country before dropping back into the forest. Camping is available all year, except during periods of drought, when it is often prohibited due to fire danger. Interpretive programs are offered in the spring and summer months; other amenities include an amphitheater, picnic tables, outdoor grills, covered shelters, restrooms, and a playground.

For ham/amateur radio operators, two linked repeaters are near the top of the mountain. The frequencies are 146.74 MHz, with a 600 kHz negative offset (the 2 meter repeater), and 53.75 MHz, with a 1.7 MHz negative offset, and a PL Tone of 100 Hz (the 6 meter repeater).

Images

References

External links
 
 
 

Parks in Whitman County, Washington
Landforms of Whitman County, Washington
Buttes of Washington (state)